Admir Mehmedi (born 16 March 1991) is a Swiss professional footballer who plays as a second striker or centre forward for Süper Lig club Antalyaspor. He represented the Switzerland national team.

Early life
Mehmedi was born in Gostivar, North Macedonia. He is of Albanian heritage. At the age of 2, his family emigrated to Switzerland and he soon joined local side Bellinzona, before signing for FC Winterthur, from where Zürich scouted him. In 2006, he moved to Zürich. Mehmedi came through the youth system after being spotted as a youngster and joined the senior team in 2008.

Club career

Zürich
Mehmedi began his senior career with FC Zürich at the age of 17. Within two years he was included in the first-team squad and by 2010 he was a first-team regular. He made his senior side debut on 20 July 2008 and scored two goals in eleven appearances, in addition to winning the Swiss Super League in his debut season with the club.

Being a first team regular in 2010, Mehmedi established himself as a physical striker, excellent in the box as well as having a good turn of pace, he was also technically great. During his time with Zürich, Mehmedi scored nineteen goals and provided nine assists.

In the January transfer window in 2012, Mehmedi moved to Dynamo Kyiv.

Dynamo Kyiv
On 13 January 2012, Mehmedi signed for the Ukrainian club Dynamo Kyiv from FC Zürich on a five-year deal. During his season and a half with Kyiv, he mainly played coming off the bench. Seeking more playing time and to be included again in the Switzerland national team, Mehmedi moved to Bundesliga team SC Freiburg.

Freiburg
On 11 July 2013, Mehmedi moved to SC Freiburg initially to join on loan, although his contract also stipulates that Freiburg have an option to make the move permanent. Freiburg's acting sporting director Klemens Hartenbach stated that he was delighted the transfer went through. Hartenbach stated "He's a very versatile attacking player who understands the game and has already proven he can play at the highest level". On 26 May 2014, Freiburg decided to buy Mehmedi for a reported €6 million after having a good season, scoring 12 goals in 32 games during his loan spell with the Bundesliga side.

Bayer Leverkusen
On 11 June 2015, Mehmedi joined Bayer Leverkusen after Freiburg was relegated from the Bundesliga.

VfL Wolfsburg
On 31 January 2018, Mehmedi joined VfL Wolfsburg on a 4-year-deal for €8 million.

Antalyaspor
On 14 January 2022, Mehmedi signed a 2.5-year contract with Antalyaspor in Turkey.

International career

Under-21
Mehmedi was a crucial member of the Swiss U-21 side in the 2011 UEFA European Under-21 Football Championship. Mehmedi received the silver boot with three goals in the tournament and was selected in the UEFA Euro U-21 2011 Team of the Tournament. Along with Xherdan Shaqiri, Mehmedi was being tipped as the future of Swiss football.

Senior
Mehmedi was part of the Swiss team at the 2012 Summer Olympics.

Mehmedi made his debut for the Swiss national team against England, in a UEFA Euro 2012 qualifying match, coming on as a substitute. Mehmedi scored his first goal for Switzerland in his side's 5–3 win over Germany. The Swiss national side had not beaten the Germans since 1956.

On 15 June 2014, he replaced Valentin Stocker at half time in Switzerland's opening 2014 FIFA World Cup match against Ecuador. Two minutes later, he headed in Ricardo Rodríguez's corner to equalise as Switzerland eventually won 2–1.

Two years to the day after he scored in the 2014 World Cup against Ecuador, Mehmedi scored Switzerland's equaliser in their 1–1 group-stage draw against Romania in UEFA Euro 2016.

Following his participation in Switzerland's UEFA Euro 2020 campaign, in which they reached the quarter-finals for the first time, Mehmedi officially announced his retirement from the national side on 16 July 2021.

Personal life
In 2016, Mehmedi visited Padalište, where he witnessed a family of six living in poverty. He gifted a house to the poor family in Macedonia, the country of his birth, stating: "You know, building a house is not cheap, but I appreciate what I have, and I want others to feel fine as well."

Mehmedi is married and has a son.

Career statistics

Club

International
Source:

Switzerland score listed first, score column indicates score after each Mehmedi goal.

Honours
Switzerland U21
UEFA European Under-21 Championship runner-up: 2011

References

External links

Official Website
Profile at FC Zurich Stats
 at Bundesliga Official Site
A Team U21 U20 U19 U17 U16 profiles at Swiss FA

1991 births
Living people
People from Gostivar
Association football forwards
21st-century Swiss people
Swiss men's footballers
Switzerland youth international footballers
Olympic footballers of Switzerland
Switzerland under-21 international footballers
Switzerland international footballers
Swiss people of Macedonian descent
Macedonian footballers
Macedonian emigrants to Switzerland
Albanians in North Macedonia
FC Zürich players
FC Dynamo Kyiv players
SC Freiburg players
Bayer 04 Leverkusen players
VfL Wolfsburg players
Antalyaspor footballers
Swiss Super League players
Ukrainian Premier League players
Bundesliga players
Süper Lig players
Footballers at the 2012 Summer Olympics
2014 FIFA World Cup players
UEFA Euro 2016 players
UEFA Euro 2020 players
Swiss expatriate footballers
Swiss expatriate sportspeople in Ukraine
Expatriate footballers in Ukraine
Swiss expatriate sportspeople in Germany
Expatriate footballers in Germany
Swiss expatriate sportspeople in Turkey
Expatriate footballers in Turkey